Ленинград уделывает Америку (Диск 1) ('Leningrad Does America (Disc 1)) is a 2003 album by the Russian band Leningrad.

Track listing
"Когда нет денег" - Kogda net deneg - (When there's no money) – 3:48 
"Группа крови" - Gruppa krovi - (Blood type) – 4:42 
"Дачники" - Dachniki - (Farmers) – 3:15 
"Пидарасы" - Pidarasy - (Fags) – 3:47 
"Дикий мужчина" - Dikiy muzhchina - (Wild man) – 3:56 
"Бляди" - Blyadi - (Whores) – 3:45 
"Космос" - Kosmos - (Space) – 2:54 
"Полные карманы (У меня есть всё)" - Polnye karmany (U menya est vsyo) - (Full pockets (I have everything)) – 5:40 
"Ну, погоди!" - Nu, pogodi! - (Watch out) – 2:46 
"WWW" – 4:14 
"Мне бы в небо" - Mne by v nebo - (I want to go to the sky) – 4:57 
"День рождения" - Den rozhdeniya - (Birthday) – 2:10 
"Терминатор" - Terminator – 3:24
"Новый год" - Novy god - (New Year) – 2:43

Leningrad (band) albums
2003 live albums